Messer is an unincorporated community located on State Highway 93 in Choctaw County, Oklahoma, United States.

A post office was established at Messer, Indian Territory on January 4, 1907. It closed on February 29, 1916.  At the time of its founding, Messer was located in Kiamitia County, a part of the Apukshunnubbee District of the Choctaw Nation.

References

Unincorporated communities in Choctaw County, Oklahoma
Unincorporated communities in Oklahoma